Pierre-Aimé Millet de la Turtaudière (1783 in Angers – 1873) was a French naturalist.

He was Secrétaire Général de la Société d'Agriculture d' Angers.

Works
Partial list
1813: Mollusques terrestres et fluviatiles, observés dans le Département de Maine et Loire. pp. i.xi [= 1-11], 1-82, 1 tableau. Angers. (Pavie)
1854 Paléontologie de Maine et Loire : comprenant avec des observations et l'indication des diverses formations géologiques du département de Maine et Loire, un relevé des roches, des minéraux et des fossiles qui se rapportent à chacune d'elles  Angers :Impr. de Cosnier et Lachèse Online here
1870. Faune des invertébrés de Maine et Loire comprenant les 2e, 3e et 4e embranchements du règne animal ou Seconde partie de la Faune de Maine-et-Loire, Tome premier. E. Barassé imp.-lib., Angers : 371 pp.
1872. Faune des invertébrés du Maine-et-Loire. Tome second. E. Barassé éd. Angers, 394 pp.
See also WorldCat listings online here

References
Anonym, 1867 [Millet de Turtaudiere, P. A.]  Annuaire Inst. Prov., Paris 9 (2) 524-531 bibliography	
Boreau, A., 1874 [Millet de Turtaudiere, P. A.]  Mém. Soc. Acad. Maine et Loire, Angers 30 1-6
Constantin, R., 1992 Memorial des Coléopteristes Français. Bull. liaison Assoc. Col. reg. parisienne, Paris (Suppl. 14): 1-92 62 plates	
Fauvel, C. A. A.,  1874 [Millet de Turtaudiere, P. A.]  Annuaire Ent. (A. Fauvel), Caen''; Paris 2 : 122
Gaedecke, R. and Groll, E. K. (Hrsg.): Biografien der Entomologen der Welt : Datenbank. Version 4.15 : Senckenberg Deutsches Entomologisches Institut, 2010 

Conchologists
French entomologists
French malacologists
French paleontologists
People from Angers
1783 births
1873 deaths